The 2010 InterLiga group stage was played on January 2–10, 2010.  The top two teams in each group progressed to the 2010 InterLiga Final.

Group A 

Kickoffs are given in (UTC-6).

Group B 

Kickoffs are given in (UTC-6).

References 

2010 Group Stage